Triveniganj is a town and a notified area in Supaul district in the state of Bihar, India. It has 27 Panchayats and 64 Revenue Villages. Triveniganj is counted as a major agriculture market of Kosi zone.

Triveniganj is also among only four subdivisions in Supaul and it is also a block of Supaul.
Triveniganj, a small beautiful town is surrounded by lush green fields.

Geography
Triveniganj has an average elevation of 59 metres (193 feet).

Demographics
As of 2011 Triveniganj had a population of 322,734. Males constitute 52%(168014) of the population and females 48%(154720). Triveniganj has an average literacy rate of 49.3%, lower than the national average of 74.04%: male literacy was 58.1%, and female literacy was 39.7%. In Triveniganj, 18.4% of the population was under 6 years of age.

References

Cities and towns in Supaul district